Lukovdol is a small village located in the Gorski Kotar region of Croatia, about one mile south of the Slovenian border. Lukovdol is part of Vrbovsko municipality. Lukovdol has an area of 5.91 km2. As of 2011, there were 129 people living in Lukovdol. Local industries include cattle raising, lumber processing, and textile products.

Lukovdol is the birthplace of Ivan Goran Kovačić, one of Croatia's most notable poets of the 20th century, and the site of a memorial museum dedicated to him, opened in 1975.

References

External links

Populated places in Primorje-Gorski Kotar County